Thomas Rabou (born 12 December 1983 in 's-Hertogenbosch) is a Dutch former professional cyclist, who rode professionally between 2005 and 2017.

Major results

2006
 1st Overall Tour of Siam
 2nd Overall Tour de la Pharmacie Centrale
1st Stage 2
 8th Overall Tour of Hainan
2008
 1st Stage 5a (TTT) Volta a Lleida
 1st Stage 2 Cinturó de l'Empordà
2009
 8th Overall Les 3 Jours de Vaucluse
 10th Overall Tour Alsace
2010
 Tour of California
1st  Mountains classification
 Most courageous rider, Stage 2
2012
 1st Stage 3 Vuelta Mexico Telmex
2013
 3rd Melaka Governor's Cup
 5th Overall Tour de Korea
 9th Overall Tour de Filipinas
1st Mountains classification
2014
 1st Critérium International d'Alger
 3rd GP de la Ville d'Oran
 4th Overall Tour de Blida
1st Stage 2
 7th Overall New Zealand Cycle Classic
2015
 1st Stage 3 Tour de Kumano
 1st Stage 7 Tour de Singkarak
 6th Overall Tour of Taihu Lake
2016
 6th Overall Tour of China II
1st Prologue

References

External links

1983 births
Living people
Dutch male cyclists
Sportspeople from 's-Hertogenbosch
Cyclists from North Brabant
20th-century Dutch people
21st-century Dutch people